Simple Grid Protocol is a free open source grid computing package. Developed & maintained by Brendan Kosowski, the package includes the protocol & software tools needed to get a computational grid up and running on Linux & BSD.

Coded in SBCL (Steel Bank Common Lisp), Simple Grid Protocol allows computer programs to utilize the unused CPU resources of other computers on a network or the Internet.

As of version 1.2, Simple Grid Protocol can execute multiple programming threads on multiple computers concurrently. Custom multi-threading functions (utilizing operating system threads) for Linux & BSD allow multi-threading on single-thread SBCL implementations. Originally coded in CLISP, version 1.2 included the change to SBCL coding.

BSD Operating Systems supported include FreeBSD, NetBSD, OpenBSD & DragonFly BSD.

An optional XML interface allows any XML capable programming language to send Lisp programs to the grid for execution.

External links 
Simple Grid Protocol home page

Grid computing
Common Lisp (programming language) software